Sir William Thomas, 1st Baronet (29 July 1641 – 18 November 1706) was an English politician who sat in the House of Commons from 1661 to 1679, and from 1680 to 1706. 
 
Thomas was created Baronet of Folkington in the County of Sussex, created in the Baronetage of England on 23 July 1660. He was Member of Parliament for Seaford from 1661 to 1681. and for Sussex in 1681. He was Colonel of one of the regiments of Sussex Militia in 1697.

Thomas married Barbara Springet, daughter of Sir Herbert Springet, 1st Baronet MP for New Shoreham and Sussex.
The title became extinct on his death aged 65 in 1706.

References

1641 births
1706 deaths
Baronets in the Baronetage of England
Sussex Militia officers
English MPs 1661–1679
English MPs 1679
English MPs 1680–1681
English MPs 1681
English MPs 1685–1687
English MPs 1689–1690
English MPs 1690–1695
English MPs 1695–1698
English MPs 1698–1700
English MPs 1701
English MPs 1701–1702
English MPs 1702–1705
English MPs 1705–1707